Hacker groups are informal communities that began to flourish in the early 1980s, with the advent of the home computer.

Overview
Prior to that time, the term hacker was simply a referral to any computer hobbyist. The hacker groups were out to make names for themselves, and were often spurred on by their own press. This was a heyday of hacking, at a time before there was much law against computer crime. Hacker groups provided access to information and resources, and a place to learn from other members. Hackers could also gain credibility by being affiliated with an elite group. The names of hacker groups often parody large corporations, governments, police and criminals; and often used specialized orthography.

See also
List of hacker groups

References

Underground computer groups